The 1980 Harlow District Council election took place on 1 May 1980 to elect members of Harlow District Council in Essex, England. This was on the same day as other local elections. The Labour Party retained control of the council.

Election result

Ward results

Brays Grove

Great Parndon

Hare Street and Town Centre

Kingsmoor

Latton Bush

Little Parndon

Mark Hall South

Netteswell East

Netteswell West

Old Harlow

Passmores

Potter Street

Stewards

Tye Green (2 seats)

References

1980
1980 English local elections
1980s in Essex